William "Chip" Hallock Stokes (born February 18, 1957, in Manhasset, New York) is the 12th and current bishop of the Episcopal Diocese of New Jersey and 1079th in succession in the Episcopal Church, succeeding Bishop George Councell.

Biography
He was elected on May 4, 2013, and consecrated November 2, 2013 at Trinity Cathedral in Trenton, New Jersey. Prior to being raised to the episcopate, Bishop Stokes served as rector of St. Paul's Church, Delray Beach, Florida. He is an alumnus of Xavier High School, Manhattan College and the General Theological Seminary. He currently lives in Trenton with his wife, Susan. They have four grown children, and three grandchildren.

See also
 List of Episcopal bishops of the United States
 Historical list of the Episcopal bishops of the United States

References

1957 births
Living people
21st-century Anglican bishops in the United States
Clergy from New York City
Manhattan College alumni
General Theological Seminary alumni
Xavier High School (New York City) alumni
Episcopal bishops of New Jersey